The Sfincia di San Giuseppe, Sfincia or Spincia ri San Giuseppi in Sicilian language is a typical Sicilian dessert, traditionally prepared for the day of St. Joseph (19th of March). It is recognised as PAT - Prodotto Agroalimentare Tradizionale (traditional Italian regional food product) by the Italian Ministry of Agricultural, Food and Forestry Policies.

It is a fried soft pastry covered and filled with sweet ricotta and candied fruit (usually a cherry and orange).

Etymology 
The Sicilian term Spincia can derive from the Latin spongia and the Arabic ﺍﺴﻔﻨﺞ isfanǧ, both literally meaning "sponge" for the peculiar consistency and form of this fried pastry, and both are possible considering the Arabic influences on Sicilian, even though it is a Romance language (so coming mainly from Latin). In Italian the singular is Sfincia, the plural Sfincie, in Sicilian the singular is Sfincia (or Spincia) and the plural is Sfinci.

History 
Sfinci were created in the current version by the Nuns of Saint Francis' Stigmata, in Palermo, the Sicilian capital city, adapting a traditional dish of Persian and Arabic cuisine. They dedicated sfinci to Saint Joseph for the simplicity of their ingredients, and it was enriched with ricotta and candied fruit from the bakers of the city.

In 1784, Sfinci were object of a political fight between tavern and pâtisserie owners of Palermo, with the second ones failing to keep a monopoly on the production of these desserts.

Sfinci are currently common to be found in bakeries and patisseries, especially in western Sicily.

See also 

 Cannoli
 Ricotta
 Candied fruit

References 

Cuisine of Sicily
Desserts